TwitchCon is a semi-annual gaming convention for the livestreaming video platform Twitch. The convention is organized by Twitch Interactive and focuses on the general culture of livestreaming and video gaming. TwitchCon also serves as an opportunity for streamers and content creators to improve their stream quality and grow their brand. TwitchCon is open to industry professionals, streamers, and fans; the convention allows community members to meet streamers, discover new products, and trial new games. The first convention was held in 2015 in San Francisco. In 2019, the first European convention was held in Berlin. The most recent convention was held in October 2022, in San Diego. TwitchCon is normally hosted twice a year, once in North America for three days and once in Europe for two days. All North American conventions were held in California until 2023, in which an event in Nevada will take place. The European conventions cycle between countries.

History

2015
The inaugural TwitchCon was held at the Moscone Center in San Francisco on September 25 and 26, 2015. The event was organized by Twitch, and featured a keynote by Twitch CEO Emmett Shear. All of the convention's panels were livestreamed on Twitch.

2016
In 2016, the convention was moved to the San Diego Convention Center and expanded to a three-day annual event. This TwitchCon introduced sponsors such as Xbox, Truth, and Amazon Game Studios.

2017
In 2017, TwitchCon took place at the Long Beach Convention Center in Long Beach, California. This included the first esports tournaments to be held at TwitchCon included H1Z1 Arena, Lineage 2: Revolution 30 vs 30 Fortress Siege Showcase, and Power Rangers: Legacy Wars Showdown.

2018
TwitchCon 2018 took place at the McEnery Convention Center in San Jose, California. The main presentation was held on the first day of the event by djWHEAT, director of Twitch studios, who made numerous statements about forthcoming features for the platform. Twitch Speaks, a speaking series first presented at TwitchCon 2018, featured Tony Hawk, Kevin Smith, Felicia Day, Emmett Shear, and Ninja. The Fall Skirmish final, a competitive Fortnite tournament final, was held at TwitchCon 2018, at the time making it the second largest Fortnite LAN event held.

2019
The inaugural TwitchCon Europe took place at CityCube Berlin in Germany on April 13–14, 2019. American actor, singer, producer, and businessman David Hasselhoff appeared as a motivational speaker at the event. Attendees had to be over the age of 18 to enter TwitchCon Europe, Berlin.

TwitchCon North America returned to San Diego, taking place from September 27–29, 2019. It introduced the debut of an updated Twitch logo, TwitchCon logo, and brand design. This was the second time the event had been held in San Diego, with the first being held in 2016. This was also the first time a TwitchCon event was held at a venue more than one time.

2020
Due to the COVID-19 pandemic, TwitchCon North America, which was scheduled to occur at the San Diego Convention Center between September 25 and 27, 2020, as well as TwitchCon Europe, which was scheduled to occur at RAI Amsterdam Convention Centre in Amsterdam between May 2 and 3, 2020, were cancelled. On November 14, 2020, in lieu of TwitchCon, Twitch held a 12-hour virtual convention named "GlitchCon." Over 425 streamers participated in the event. Notable activities included Twitch Rivals tournaments for Fortnite and Fall Guys, the Austin Talent Show featuring judges T-Pain and Andy Milonakis, and a US$1 million donation being made to the AbleGamers foundation.

Neither a GlitchCon or TwitchCon event occurred in 2021. The next event would be held in Amsterdam in 2022.

2022
After a two-year hiatus, TwitchCon Europe took place in July 2022 at the RAI Amsterdam Convention Centre.

TwitchCon North America took place at the San Diego Convention Center in October 2022. This was the third time the event has been held in San Diego. The events required face coverings and had numerous COVID-19 prevention protocols in place.  

The TwitchCon San Diego party was held at Petco Park, and featured the artists Meet Me at The Altar, Kim Petras, and Megan Thee Stallion. The party gained significant media attention when an attendee cosplaying as Master Chief from the Halo series of video games was allowed on stage during a performance with Megan Thee Stallion. 

However, many people were critical of the San Diego event. One of the more notable criticisms of the event was the lack of security protocols in place for exhibitors, resulting in overcrowded venues and reported stalking incidents. Legion by Lenovo and Intel hosted an interactive exhibit that involved attendees dueling in an arena using large padded instruments and landing in a pit of foam cubes. However, the arena was not padded properly, causing people to land on hard ground, resulting in various injuries. Of the two injured, streamer Adriana Chechik reported that she had broken her back after landing, and had to undergo surgery to set the fracture with a rod implant. Lenovo and Intel both remained silent on the matter. Chechik posted on social media that neither Intel, Lenovo, or Twitch had contacted her directly about the incident.

At TwitchCon San Diego, Twitch did not announce a location for a potential TwitchCon North America event in 2023 during the closing ceremony, breaking years-old tradition.

2023
TwitchCon Europe will take place at the Paris Expo Porte de Versailles in Paris, France on July 8–9, 2023.

On February 16, it was announced that TwitchCon North America will be held at the Las Vegas Convention Center on October 20–22, 2023. This will mark the first TwitchCon North America event outside of California.

Locations and dates

North America

Europe

References

External links
 

Annual events
Recurring events established in 2015
Twitch (service)
Conventions (meetings)
Video game conventions
Gaming conventions
Nintendo events
Super Smash Bros. tournaments